Daeida Hartell Wilcox Beveridge (1861 – August 7, 1914) donated land, named, and founded Hollywood, northwest of Los Angeles, California, in 1888.

Early life
Born in Hicksville, Ohio, Daeida was the daughter of farmers Amelia and John Emerson Hartell, and attended private school in Hicksville and later public school in Canton, Ohio.

Hollywood
A few months after her family acquired its new ranch, Daeida visited her hometown of Hicksville. Daeida heard the name Hollywood from another traveler, who owned an estate by that name in Illinois.

In August 1887 at the age of 25, she and her husband began to lay out a new town on their ranch, with a subdivision map filed for "Hollywood, California," with the Los Angeles County Recorder's office. Their ranch, purchased at $150 an acre, was sold for $1,000 a lot. The 1880s real-estate boom busted that same year, yet Hollywood began its slow growth.

With her second husband, Daeida continued leading development efforts and was instrumental in establishing much of Hollywood's civic infrastructure, including the city hall, library, police station, primary school, tennis club, post office, city park, and one of the two original commercial districts. She built the Hollywood National Bank and Citizens Savings Bank, a post office, a theatrical playhouse, and the city's first sidewalks. She gave land for three churches, and donated three prime lots on Cahuenga Boulevard and on Prospect (Hollywood Boulevard) to the painter Paul de Longpré, for an estate that came to include extensive flower gardens and a Mission Revival style mansion with a public art gallery. It became a popular tourist attraction.

Personal life
She married prohibitionist Harvey Henderson Wilcox, and they moved to Kansas. In 1886 they moved to Southern California and in 1887 purchased a  ranch of apricot and fig groves outside of Los Angeles at the foot of the Hollywood Hills. Harvey Wilcox died in 1891. 

In 1894, Daeida married Philo J. Beveridge, a businessman and prominent citizen of Hollywood, the son of an Illinois governor, who shared her vision of community. The Beveridges had four children

Death
She came to be called the "Mother of Hollywood." Daeida Wilcox Beveridge died of cancer on 7 August 1914.

The Los Angeles Times obituary stated that it was Daeida's dream of beauty that gave world fame to Hollywood, years before the first movie company arrived in 1913. Her associates said she was "reliable, forcible, kindly, a woman of rare judgment, and a worthy opponent."

Daeida Hartell Wilcox Beveridge was inducted into the Ohio Women’s Hall of Fame in 1995.

Namesakes
Wilcox Avenue — a north/south street, one block west of Cahuenga Boulevard in Hollywood and Hancock Park, Los Angeles.
Wilcox Post Office—Hollywood Station (United States Post Office, Hollywood, California).
Wilcox Police Station—Hollywood Community Police Station.
Daeida Magazine — Daeida.com: Daeida Magazine.com: Hollywood's People, Passions, and Its Past

See also
:Category:Hollywood, Los Angeles history and culture
Rancho La Brea

References

External links
 Hicksville Historical Society: Daeida Hartle Wilcox Beveridge

1861 births
1914 deaths
American city founders
Businesspeople from Los Angeles
Land owners from California
People from Hollywood, Los Angeles
People from Hicksville, Ohio
Burials at Hollywood Forever Cemetery
Deaths from cancer in California
19th-century American businesspeople
19th-century American businesswomen